The 1969–70 South Pacific cyclone season was a very inactive season, featuring only seven disturbances, five tropical cyclones, and two severe tropical cyclones. The season featured only one landfalling storm, Cyclone Dawn. Dawn formed very late, on February 10, and the last storm, Tropical Depression Isa, dissipated early, on April 19. On January 2, a tropical low developed onto a weak depression on the Coral Sea. It later crossed into the Australian Region, where it strengthened onto Severe Tropical Cyclone Ada.



Seasonal summary

Systems

Tropical Cyclone Dawn 

Dawn formed on February 16 on the Gulf of Carpentaria as a tropical low. It strengthened to a Category 2 tropical cyclone (Australian scale) before dissipating, northwest of Brisbane on the South Pacific basin.

Severe Tropical Cyclone Dolly 

Dolly formed to the east of Luganville on February 11, and was last noted on February 25 to the north of French Polynesia. It peaked as a Category 1 tropical cyclone (SSHWS) or Category 3 severe tropical cyclone (Australian scale).

Severe Tropical Cyclone Emma 

Severe Tropical Cyclone Emma originated as a depression to the west of Wallis and Futuna. It moved to the south-southeast before it was last noted on March 6 to the north of French Polynesia.

Tropical Cyclone Gillian 

A disturbance developed to a depression, to the south-southwest of Fiji. It continued its L movement while strengthening to a tropical cyclone before weakening due to the cold waters and wind shear. Gillian was last noted, far south of Marshall Islands as it dissipated. It was strengthened to a equivalent of a tropical storm on the SSHWS scale.

Tropical Cyclone Helen 

A tropical low developed to a depression, south of Tuvalu. It traveled to the west, strengthening as Tropical Cyclone Helen before weakening. It was last noted on April 17, south-southwest of Fiji.

On April 17, 1970, Apollo 13 was making its final descent over the splashdown zone when they spotted a weakening Helen as they were re-entering the earth's atmosphere. Mission control had been tracking the storm to make sure it did not interfere with the mission's re-entry.

Tropical Cyclone Isa 

It was unknown if the precursor to Isa was noted to the southeast, or to the southwest of Solomon Islands. It strengthened to a Category 1 tropical cyclone (Australian scale), but it remained a tropical depression (SSHWS). It was last noted on April 19, as it dissipated.

Other systems 
During January 5, the Australian Bureau of Meteorology first noted the existence of a weak tropical depression over the eastern Coral Sea, however, it has since been determined that the depression developed during January 2 near . The system was subsequently tracked by infrequent satelitte imagery, which revealed that it slowly completed a cyclonic loop near the Solomon Islands before curving back toward the southwest. The system entered the Australian region during 15 January, where it subsequently became Severe Tropical Cyclone Ada before making landfall on Queensland during 17 January.

Seasonal effects

References

External links 
 Atlantic hurricane seasons: 1969, 1970 
 Eastern Pacific hurricane seasons: 1969, 1970 
 Western Pacific typhoon seasons: 1969, 1970 
 North Indian Ocean cyclone seasons: 1969, 1970

 
South Pacific cyclone seasons